North Colorado Medical Center is a hospital located in Greeley, Colorado. The hospital is managed by Banner Health and has 223 beds.  It is a teaching hospital and founded in 1952.

References

External Links
https://www.bannerhealth.com/locations/greeley/north-colorado-medical-center

Hospitals in Colorado
Greeley, Colorado
Buildings and structures in Weld County, Colorado